David Fretwell (born 18 February 1952) is an English retired footballer who played in the Football League for Bradford City and Wigan Athletic. He signed for Bradford City as an amateur in 1967, making 253 league, 18 FA Cup and 9 League Cup appearances for them between 1971 and 1978.

He also played non-league football for Northwich Victoria, Mossley, where he scored once from 63 appearances in all competitions, and Salisbury City, and in the United States for the California Sunshine and the Chicago Sting.

Sources

References

1952 births
Living people
Sportspeople from Normanton, West Yorkshire
English footballers
Association football defenders
Bradford City A.F.C. players
California Sunshine players
Chicago Sting (NASL) players
Wigan Athletic F.C. players
Northwich Victoria F.C. players
Mossley A.F.C. players
Salisbury City F.C. players
English Football League players
American Soccer League (1933–1983) players
National League (English football) players
Northern Premier League players
English expatriate footballers
English expatriate sportspeople in the United States
Expatriate soccer players in the United States